Julio Humberto Gonzalo Benito Jung del Favero (born 21 March 1942) is a Chilean actor.

Selected filmography
 Amnesia (1994)
 Coronation (2000)
 The Dancer and the Thief  (2009)
 Cachimba (2004)
 Los versos del olvido (2017)
 Y de pronto el amanecer (2017)

References

External links
 

1942 births
Living people
Chilean male film actors
Chilean male telenovela actors
Chilean male television actors
20th-century Chilean male actors
21st-century Chilean male actors
Chilean male comedians
Chilean actor-politicians